Agdary (Agdaarı) is a rural locality (a selo), the administrative centre of and one of three settlements, in addition to Tolon and Eyikyar, in Khadansky Rural Okrug of Suntarsky District in the Sakha Republic, Russia. Its population as of the 2002 Census was 478.

References

Notes

Sources
Official website of the Sakha Republic. Registry of the Administrative-Territorial Divisions of the Sakha Republic. Suntarsky District. 

Rural localities in Suntarsky District